Stanislav Pavlovich Mikheyev (1940 – 23 April 2011) was a Russian physicist known for the discovery of the MSW effect.

Education and research
Stanislav Mikheyev graduated from Faculty of Physics of Moscow State University in 1965. Then he became a researcher at Lebedev Physical Institute. Since 1970 he was a researcher at the Institute for Nuclear Research of the USSR Academy of Sciences (Russian Academy of Sciences since 1991), where he earned his Ph.D. in physics in 1983.

He worked on Baksan Underground Scintillator Telescope for a long time. He has been the leader of two experiments carried out on Baksan Telescope: observation of upward-going muons and searches for superheavy magnetic monopoles.

In 1985 Stanislav Mikheyev and Alexei Smirnov considered the propagation of oscillating neutrinos in matter with varying density and suggested an explanation for the solar neutrino problem (the MSW effect). From 1991 to 1998 Mikheyev worked on the MACRO detector. His activities were also related to the Baksan Neutrino Observatory, the Baikal Neutrino Telescope and the T2K experiment.

Awards
Mikheyev was awarded the Bruno Pontecorvo Prize (2006, jointly with Smirnov and Wolfenstein) and the Sakurai Prize (2008, jointly with Smirnov).

See also
List of theoretical physicists

References

External links
papers in the INSPIRE-HEP database
 Stanislav Pavlovich Mikheev (in Russian)

Soviet physicists
20th-century Russian physicists
Neutrino physicists
Moscow State University alumni
2011 deaths
1940 births
Theoretical physicists
J. J. Sakurai Prize for Theoretical Particle Physics recipients